HSAD may refer to:
 4,5:9,10-diseco-3-hydroxy-5,9,17-trioxoandrosta-1(10),2-diene-4-oate hydrolase, an enzyme
 Haryana State Akali Dal, a Sikh political party in India